The murder of Sophie Lancaster occurred in England in August 2007. The victim and her boyfriend, Robert Maltby, were attacked by a group of teenage boys while walking through Stubbylee Park in Bacup, Rossendale, Lancashire, on 11 August 2007. As a result of the severe head injuries Lancaster sustained in the attack, she went into a coma from which she never regained consciousness, and died of her injuries thirteen days later. The police said the attack may have been linked to the couple wearing gothic fashion and being members of the goth subculture.

Five teenage boys were later arrested and charged with murder. Two of them, Ryan Herbert and Brendon Harris were convicted of murder and sentenced to life imprisonment. The other three were convicted and jailed for grievous bodily harm. A memorial fund was established in Lancaster's name, and numerous events have paid tribute to her locally, nationally and internationally. Plays, films, art and books have covered the issues surrounding the murder.

Background 
Sophie Lancaster (born 26 November 1986) was a former pupil at Bacup and Rawtenstall Grammar School and Haslingden High School, and a gap year student planning to attend Accrington and Rossendale College to do an English degree. She had been dating Robert Maltby, a 21-year-old art student from Manchester, for three years, and they both had a long-standing attachment to the goth subculture. The couple's family described them as "Goths", and said: "They're both intelligent, sensitive kids. They're not the sort of people to get in trouble, but they have had problems in the past because they stand out".

Attack 
While returning home, Lancaster and Maltby were subjected to a "vicious mob attack" from "a large group of people" between 1:10 and 1:20 a.m. on Saturday, 11 August 2007, at the skate park area of Stubbylee Park, Bacup. The couple were walking home and came across a gang of teenagers at the entrance to the park. The group followed them and assaulted Maltby, knocking him unconscious, and then Lancaster, who was shielding her boyfriend. A 15-year-old witness told police: "They were running over and just kicking her in the head and jumping up and down on her head". One witness used a mobile phone to call for emergency services saying: "We need... we need an ambulance at Bacup Park, this mosher has just been banged because he's a mosher". The Guardian reported that afterwards, "The killers celebrated their attack on the goths – or 'moshers' – by telling friends afterwards that they had 'done summat [something] good', and claiming: 'There's two moshers nearly dead up Bacup park – you wanna see them – they're a right mess'."

Police said that it was "a sustained attack during the course of which the pair received serious head injuries and their faces were so swollen we could not ascertain which one was female and which one was male". Both were hospitalised as a result of the attack, initially at Rochdale Infirmary. Maltby's injuries left him in a coma and with internal bleeding. He gradually recovered, but had lost memory of the time leading up to, and during, the attack. Lancaster, in a deep coma, was placed on life support and moved to Fairfield General Hospital in Bury, then to the neurology unit at Hope Hospital (now Salford Royal Hospital) in Salford. The hospital staff determined that she would never regain consciousness, and on 24 August 2007 her life support was terminated.

Arrests and investigation 
Lancashire Police arrested five individuals in connection with the attack, but conducted extensive further investigations, as it appeared that up to fifteen people were in the area and may have witnessed or participated in the assault. The police identified the gothic dress of the couple as a possible motivation for the attack. A 15-year-old and a 16-year-old were remanded in custody, while two 15-year-olds and a 17-year-old were released on bail. They were originally charged with causing grievous bodily harm with intent, but following Lancaster's death the Crown Prosecution Service charged all five boys with her murder.

By 5 October 2007, after questioning more than 100 people, the police concluded that they were not expecting to make any more arrests in the case, and although 15–20 people were in the park at some point during the night of the attack, they believed that many were not directly involved, as the area was a regular night time hangout spot for teenagers.

Local residents identified the park as a spot often used by "drunken, violent yobs" guilty of vandalism and under-age drinking. They had asked for measures to be taken about the area before the tragedy occurred. Following the murder, residents called for improved security in the area, but Rossendale Borough Council said park rangers would be too expensive.

Trial and aftermath
On 6 September 2007, the five suspects were charged with murder at Burnley Youth Court. Three were released on bail: two boys aged 15 and 17 from Shawforth, and a 17-year-old boy from Bacup. On 18 October at Burnley Youth Court, all five were summoned to appear at Preston Crown Court. A preliminary hearing was held on 31 October 2007, where all five were charged with the murder of Lancaster and grievous bodily harm with intent for the assault on Maltby. A further plea and case management hearing was ordered by Judge Anthony Russell QC for 14 December. The judge also indicated a provisional trial date, on both allegations, of 10 March 2008. At the hearing on 14 December 2007, the five accused pleaded not guilty on both charges.

At the beginning of the trial on 10 March 2008, all five boys pleaded guilty to the charge of grievous bodily harm with intent, Ryan Herbert pleaded guilty to murder, Brendan Harris pleaded not guilty to murder, while the murder charges against the other three were dropped.  As the trial opened the prosecution told the hearing: "Sophie and Robert were singled out not for anything they had said or done, but because they looked and dressed differently". The jury heard extensive descriptions of the severity of the attack from a number of witnesses and through a recorded phone conversation taken at the time.

At the conclusion of the trial on 27 March 2008, Brendan Harris was found guilty of murder, and the judge allowed the names of both Harris and Herbert, which had been withheld during the trial, to be made public. Detective Superintendent Mick Gradwell of Lancashire Police said it was one of the most violent murders he had come across in his career: "I do not think Herbert and Harris have recognised how violent the attack was. They have just done it without thinking, but they seemed to have enjoyed it, and carried on remorselessly kicking at two very defenceless people who were unable to protect themselves because of the level of violence inflicted upon them ... I am very critical of some of the parents involved. I really don't think they have taken completely seriously how repulsive this incident was". He said that when Harris was initially interviewed about the assaults he was "laughing and joking" with his mother.

Sentencing in the case was set for 28 April 2008. Both Harris and Herbert were sentenced to life imprisonment with the trial judge recommending that Harris should serve at least eighteen years and Herbert at least sixteen years and three months. In his closing remarks the judge described the attack as "feral thuggery" which raised questions about the "sort of society which exists in this country". He added: "This was a terrible case which has shocked and outraged all who have heard about it. At least wild animals, when they hunt in packs, have a legitimate reason for so doing, to obtain food. You have none and your behaviour on that night degrades humanity itself".

The three other defendants were also sentenced for their role in the attack. Brothers Joseph and Danny Hulme, and Daniel Mallett, who had all earlier pleaded guilty to grievous bodily harm with intent on Maltby, were jailed. Mallett was sentenced to four years and four months, and the Hulme brothers for five years and ten months each. On 13 June 2008, it was reported that all the defendants were appealing against the sentences for their convictions. The appeal was heard on 7 October 2008 with an announcement that the result would be released at a later date. On 29 October the results of the appeal were announced. Ryan Herbert had his minimum term reduced from sixteen years and three months to fifteen years and six months, a reduction of nine months after the appeal judges ruled not enough allowance had been made for his guilty plea in the initial trial. Herbert then had his tariff cut to fourteen and a half years on 10 February 2020, as a High Court judge concluded he had made "exceptional progress" in prison. Brendan Harris and the three other defendants had their appeals dismissed.

Tributes to Lancaster
The park where the attack occurred was covered with floral tributes to the couple soon after the attack, and online message boards have seen many tributes to Lancaster from well-wishers, including some from Europe and America, including a special Facebook and a Bebo group in her honour.

The attack was widely condemned in Lancashire and Rossendale by Council leaders and the local community. At the alternative electronic music festival Infest in Bradford on 26 August 2007, just after Lancaster's death, Ronan Harris of VNV Nation dedicated the song "Illusion" to her and contacted the family to offer his condolences. There has also been discussion of a plaque in her memory in the park. A song was dedicated to Lancaster in concerts at Bacup's Royal Court Theatre on 6/7 September 2007, and a collection taken. A twelve-hour-long concert in her honour was held on 6 October 2007, in the grounds of Bacup Borough F.C., featuring 10 bands. The club played a game during the concert with all the takings going to the memorial fund; this included a song written in Lancaster's honour. Lancaster's family and friends set up a website in her memory and have decided to use the contributions from wellwishers and these events to set up a special fund to be known as "S.O.P.H.I.E". Standing for "Stamp Out Prejudice Hatred and Intolerance Everywhere", it aims to "provide an appropriate memorial; a lasting legacy to raise awareness of the injustice perpetrated against Sophie Lancaster and to work towards a more tolerant, less violent society". Lancaster's mother said: "it will also help fund group sessions with young people to teach them about alternative cultures and to respect everyone". A special black ribbon was being sold to support the fund available at the many events being held across Rossendale and in local shops. Lancaster's memory was further honoured at the Eccentrik Festival in North Carolina, and it was said that "three more concerts are planned in California, one in Iowa and one in Brisbane, Australia".

A number of gothic gigs and club nights across the UK and Ireland dedicated a night to Lancaster in October and November 2007, including the Whitby Gothic Weekend. A collection was raised from these events to place a memorial bench to her in Whitby. The bench was put in place on Whitby's West Cliff in January 2008.

The "Sophie Award" has been established as an ongoing prize for innovative and experimental film-making at Bacup Film Festival. Lancaster's public funeral was organised for 12 November 2007, and attended by hundreds of people, including BBC film crews. On 25 November 2007, Lancaster's friends held a memorial concert to "commemorate Sophie's uniqueness", featuring her favourite local bands, the night before what would have been Lancaster's 21st birthday, at St Mary's Chambers, Rawtenstall; the concert was covered by Granada Television. A repeat event was planned for 26 November 2008, headlined by The Damned and AOR featuring Dave Sharp, founder member of The Alarm.

On 13 January 2009, it was announced that the Bloodstock Open Air festival were to rename their second stage to The Sophie Lancaster Stage in tribute, and to promote the S.O.P.H.I.E. Campaign. The second stage has carried the name each year since.

On 24/25 June 2008, Carabas Theatre Company performed a new dark comedy that dealt with perceptions of the Gothic subculture, donating all profits to the S.O.P.H.I.E fund. The work was performed at the Gregson Centre, Moor Lane, Lancaster. In a discussion after the performance, the cast and audience discussed Goth culture, the issues raised in the performance, and the possibility of educating young people about different subcultures to foster unity and acceptance from a young age. The work, "Suckers", was written and directed by M. J. Wesolowski, and the production raised money for the S.O.P.H.I.E fund.

On 3 June 2010, Robert Maltby began an exhibition of his own art at Affleck's Palace in Manchester containing 15 paintings inspired by Lancaster. The exhibition was called Crimson Iris: The Art of Sophie. The money raised went to the Sophie Lancaster Foundation.

The 2012 Delain album and single We Are the Others is dedicated to her memory. Delain played at Bloodstock open air and chose to play at the Sophie Lancaster stage on 7 August 2015. 
On 28 July 2012 Punk Poet Andy T (Andy Thurlow) released a song "Sophie Lancaster" on the "Life at Tether's End" LP; he normally performs this at live shows.

On 14 June 2014, it was announced that Lancaster's mother Sylvia was to receive an OBE in recognition of her campaign to promote a more tolerant society.

Media reaction 
The attack was discussed in the media in connection with a wave of youth gang-related violence in the UK over the summer of 2007, including the murder of Liverpool schoolboy Rhys Jones. Then Conservative leader David Cameron mentioned the attack as an example in a "speech criticising youth crime and Britain's 'real and growing' problem with violence". Since then, coverage has mainly been restricted to the local press and the Internet, except for the funeral, which received wider coverage. In February 2008, The Observer compared the limited amount of coverage the Lancaster case received to the large amount of coverage worldwide which the media paid to the case of discrimination faced by a Yorkshire goth couple who were thrown off a bus: "That the story received just a fraction of the coverage  by the dog-lead goths tells you something about society. The British eccentric has become the circus freak." However, the trial in March 2008 saw extensive coverage in national media. On 13 March 2008, Bizarre magazine launched a "Proud to be Different" campaign  in honour of Lancaster.

Rod Liddle of The Sunday Times observed after the murder that the victims of the attack had paid the price for the indulgence of the "feral" criminals who perpetrated it "by their parents, by the courts, by the council, by a government which wants to send fewer such people to prison."

There are a large number of Facebook groups dedicated to Lancaster. With the exception of the "Sophie Lancaster Foundation" group, none of these are official, and nearly all focus on the tragedy of her death.

On 26 November 2009, which would have been Lancaster's 23rd birthday, a 4-minute animation named Dark Angel, based on the murder, was released onto the internet and shown on MTV. The film was also projected onto a screen in the Cathedral Gardens in Manchester.

In July 2010, the book Weirdo Mosher Freak by journalist Catherine Smyth was published about the murder.

On 11 March 2011, BBC Radio 4 broadcast the play Black Roses: The Killing of Sophie Lancaster, consisting of poems by Simon Armitage telling the story of Lancaster's life, combined with the personal recollections of her mother. The role of Lancaster was played by Rachel Austin. On 11 October 2015, BBC Four broadcast Black Roses : The Killing of Sophie Lancaster, a  45-minute tribute. Her story was told through a sequence of poems by Simon Armitage. Lancaster's mother – Sylvia Lancaster – was played by actress Julie Hesmondhalgh. She spoke the words of Sylvia Lancaster about the life and death of Sophie (who was played by Austin reprising her role) throughout the programme.

On 18 June 2017, BBC Three released a film based on the events surrounding Lancaster's death, Murdered for Being Different. In 2021, it was announced that Lancaster's murder was to inspire a new storyline on Coronation Street, centred around hate crime. Character Nina Lucas (Mollie Gallagher) was attacked for her gothic appearance, as was her boyfriend Seb Franklin (Harry Visinoni) who ended up dying in hospital.

Reaction in the goth and alternative community 
The crime has received much discussion and expressions of sympathy, not just amongst the UK goth subculture, but in other subcultures, and overseas as well. Martin Coles, who organised the Whitby bench fund, said, "Since starting the online campaign to raise awareness of the collection I've been contacted by people from all over the world that have been shocked by this, and not just those from the gothic community, I've been talking to goths, bikers, metallers, people from the electro and indie scenes, just about any 'alternative' genre".

Many discussions have focused on whether the attack should be described as an example of a hate crime and has been compared to the murder of the punk Brian Deneke in the United States. It has been widely perceived by goths as a more extreme example of the social intolerance, violence and abuse people can suffer as a result of their attachment to the goth subculture.

The Observer said on 17 February 2008 that the case was one of a "rash of violent attacks targeting punk, goth and metal kids... Sophie Lancaster's case has become a rallying cry for those in the goth scene worried about this upsurge of violence". This discussion of the case led to an online petition to the Prime Minister "to Widen the definition of 'Hate Crime', to include crimes committed against a person or persons, on the basis of their appearance or subcultural interests" on the 10 Downing Street website.

Ade Varney, creator of the petition, said that goths "get verbal assaults every day, and not just from young people. But now younger teenagers have the mentality of hardened criminals, and I definitely sense this violent aspect getting worse.... Sophie's death has made people think, and I have heard of teenagers, especially girls, modifying the way they dress when they walk through certain areas". This led to political developments: the Manchester Evening News reported that Rossendale MP Janet Anderson and Hyndburn MP Greg Pope "are set to request a debate in the Commons to call for the widening of the law to include such an attack under the definition of a hate crime as soon as possible". The paper reported that they would be "putting forward an early day motion calling on the government to give the matter 'urgent consideration'."

In May 2009, the Justice Minister, Jack Straw, said that while he could not change the law, he could amend the sentencing guidelines to require judges to treat an attack on a member of a subculture as an aggravating factor, similar to a racially motivated or homophobic assault, when sentencing perpetrators.

In April 2013, the Greater Manchester Police announced they would officially begin to record offences committed against goths and other alternative groups as hate crimes, as they do with offences specifically aimed at someone's race, disability or sexual orientation.

10th Anniversary of the murder 
In 2017, Robert Maltby gave his first full-length interview on the tenth anniversary of Sophie's murder. Maltby revealed that his brain had fully recovered following the attack and he had returned to his art studies but had struggled with depression and could not bring himself to immediately visit Sophie's grave. He explained that beyond working with the producers of Murdered for Being Different he had been reluctant to talk about the events due to what he saw as the "patronising" way the crime has been depicted and that he would rather be remembered for his career in art rather than association with the murder. He also stated that he didn't view Sophie's death as a hate crime and described the media's focus on the goth angle as an "oversimplification of a much broader social issue" and "victim blaming." Maltby also revealed that he no longer followed goth fashion, had since entered into a new relationship and planned to move abroad to further his artistic ambitions.

See also
 Death of Brian Deneke
 Suicide of Nicola Ann Raphael

References

External links 
The Sophie Lancaster Foundation. Charity Commission registered charity number: 1129689
Murdered for Being Different. BBC Three.
Violence against goths is a hate crime. The Guardian. Author - Simon Price. Published 4 April 2013. Retrieved 4 November 2019.
Why Is It Increasingly Dangerous To Be Different? HuffPost (UK edition). Author - James Woods. Published 23 June 2017. Retrieved 14 July 2017.

1986 births
2000s in Lancashire
2007 deaths
2007 in England
2007 murders in the United Kingdom
August 2007 events in the United Kingdom
August 2007 crimes
Deaths by person in England
Deaths from head injury
Discrimination in England
Female murder victims
Goth subculture
History of the Borough of Rossendale
Incidents of violence against women
Murder in Lancashire
Violence against women in England
Murder committed by minors